LAL is a Toronto-based collective of musicians representing Uganda, Bangladesh, Barbados, and India featuring vocalist Rosina Kazi, laptop musician Nicholas "Murr" Murray, and bassist Ian de Sousa. The group's sound fuses South-Asian roots, West Indian fruits, and melancholic vocals with jazz and hip hop influences, down tempo grooves, broken soul, and electro. Their song lyrics are socially conscious poetry.

History
LAL formed in 1998. LAL has produced four studio albums, including Corners (2002), and Warm Belly High Power (2004), which was named the best soul album of 2004 by Exclaim!.

LAL have also performed in a variety of festivals and venues across Canada, Europe, and Pakistan. They received support from the Canada Council for the Arts for composing and recording in 2006/2007. LAL's third album is Deportation; the album featured 20 guest artists.

LAL released the album Find Safety in 2016. LAL announced the release of a new album titled Meteors Could Come Down which will release on 6 November 2020.

Discography
 Corners  (1998)
 Warm Belly High Power (2002)
 Deportation (2008)
 Find Safety (2016)
 Meteors Could Come Down (2020)

References

External links
 

Canadian electronic music groups
Canadian world music groups
Musical groups established in 2009
Musical groups from Toronto
2009 establishments in Ontario